= Billy Momo =

Swedish band

- Origin: Stockholm, Sweden
- Genres: Indie Rock, Folk
- Years active: 2007–present
- Label: Hype Music
- Members: Tomas Juto; Oskar Hovell; Tony Lind; Christopher Broman Tak; Mårten Forssman; Andreas Prybil
- Website: www.billymomo.com

Billy Momo is a Swedish six-piece band based in Stockholm. Their sound is rooted in rock/pop and mixes influences from blues, folk and Americana. The genre is described as urban folk, or New Roots. They have been compared to the sound of early Tom Waits or Beck.

== History ==
Billy Momo was formed as a duo in 2007. Tomas Juto and Oskar Hovell decided to leave their previous music endeavors to venture into the Swedish woods to collaborate and eventually formed Billy Momo. The project matured and expanded, becoming a seven piece ensemble including a guitarist, a harmonicist, a banjo player, a percussionist, as well as other strings and wind instrumentalists. Lead guitarist Oscar Harrysson later left the band, leaving the lead guitar role to Oskar Hovell and the mixing and mastering to Tomas Juto.

Their first album, Ordinary Men, was released in 2011, and re-released in 2013 when the band signed to the British label Hype Music. Billy Momo's second album, Drunktalk was released in February 2015. It contains the single "Wishing Ain't No Sin" that was used in the pre trailer for the hit TV series Better Call Saul, both season 1 and season 2. Their third album, Seven Rivers Wild, was released on November 11, 2016.

== Band Members ==
- Tomas Juto
- Oskar Hovell
- Tony Lind
- Christopher Broman Tak
- Mårten Forssman
- Andreas Prybil

== Discography ==
=== Studio albums ===
- Ordinary Men (2011)
- Drunktalk (2015)
- Seven Rivers Wild (2016)
- Roots & Vision (2019)
- Boogeyman (2023)
- It's worse than yesterday (still better than tomorrow) (2025)
